Zodarion ohridense is a spider species found in Bulgaria, Macedonia, Croatia and Greece.

See also 
 List of Zodariidae species

References

External links 

ohridense
Spiders of Europe
Spiders described in 1973